Bubble, Bubbles or The Bubble may refer to:

Common uses 
 Bubble (physics), a globule of one substance in another, usually gas in a liquid
 Soap bubble
 Economic bubble, a situation where asset prices are much higher than underlying fundamentals

Arts, entertainment and media

Fictional characters
 Bubble, a character in Absolutely Fabulous
 Bubbles, an oriole from the Angry Birds franchise
 Bubble, in the video game Clu Clu Land
 Bubbles (The Wire)
 Bubbles (Trailer Park Boys)
 Bubbles, a yellow tang fish in the Finding Nemo franchise
 Bubbles, in Jabberjaw
 Bubbles Utonium, in The Powerpuff Girls
 Bubbles (Miyako Gotokuji), in Powerpuff Girls Z
 Bubbles (The Adventures of Little Carp)
 Bubbles, in The Adventures of Timmy the Tooth
 Bubbles the Clown, a doll used in the BBC's Test Card F
 Cobra Bubbles, in Lilo & Stitch
 Bubbles DeVere, in Little Britain
 Bubbles Yablonsky, the protagonist in a series of novels by Sarah Strohmeyer
 Several SpongeBob SquarePants characters
 Bubbles, in Oddbods
 Bubbles, in webcomic Questionable Content

Film and television

Film
 Bubble (2005 film), a drama by Steven Soderbergh
 Bubble (2022 film), a Japanese animated film
 Bubbles (film), a 1930 short film
 The Bubble (1966 film), a science fiction film
 The Bubble (2001 film), a Greek film
 The Bubble (2006 film), an Israeli romantic drama 
 The Bubble (2022 film)

Television
 The Bubble (game show), 2010
 "Bubbles", a 1997 episode of Teletubbies
 "The Bubble" (30 Rock), a 2009 TV episode 
 "The Bubble" (Parks and Recreation), a 2011 TV episode

Gaming 
 Bubbles (video game), 1982
 Bubbles, gameplay items in the video game LittleBigPlanet

Music

Artists and labels
 Bubbles (band), a Swedish girl group
 Bubbles (rapper), from Roll Deep
 Bubbles, a record label owned by Erlend Øye and Marcin Oz of The Whitest Boy Alive

Songs
 "Bubble" (Band-Maid song), 2019
 "Bubble" (Fluke song), 1994
 "Bubble" (G.E.M. song), 2012
 "Bubbles" (song), by Biffy Clyro, 2009
 "Bubbles", a version of the song "I'm Forever Blowing Bubbles" adapted as the anthem of the West Ham United football club
 "Bubbles", by Frankie Laine, 1955
 "Bubbles", by The Free Design from Stars/Time/Bubbles/Love, 1970
 "Bubbles", by Herbie Hancock from Man-Child, 1976
 "Bubbles", by James from Hey Ma, 2008
 "Bubbles", by Norman Connors from You Are My Starship, written by Shunzo Ono, 1976
 "Bubbles", by Pop Will Eat Itself, first released as B-side to "Beaver Patrol", 1987
 "Bubbles", by Spooky Tooth from It's All About, 1968
 "Bubble", by Squarepusher (credited as Tom Jenkinson) from Bubble and Squeak, 1996
 "Bubbles", by System of a Down from Steal This Album!, 2002
 "The Bubble", by Status Quo from The Party Ain't Over Yet, 2005

Other uses in arts, entertainment and media
 Bubbles (painting), by Sir John Everett Millais, 1886, also used to market Pears soap
 Bubbles: Spheres Volume I: Microspherology, a work by Peter Sloterdijk
 Bubble Comics, a Russian comic book publisher

People 
 Bubbles Anderson (Theodore M. Anderson, 1904-1943), American baseball player in the Negro leagues
 Bubbles Hargrave (Eugene Franklin Hargrave, 1892-1969), American baseball player
 Barney Bubbles (Colin Fulcher, 1942–1983), English graphic artist
 John W. Bubbles (John William Sublett, 1902–1986), American entertainer
 Patricia Harmsworth, Viscountess Rothermere (1933–1992), English socialite and actress
 William James (Royal Navy officer, born 1881) (1881–1974), British admiral, politician and author
Bubbles (painting)
 Billy Myers (Canadian football) (1923–2019)
 Mary Nolan (1902-1948), American actress, singer and dancer
 John O'Dwyer (born 1991), Irish hurler
 Beverly Sills (1929–2007), opera singer
 Bianca Sloof, a contestant on Real Chance of Love (season 1) and Charm School with Ricki Lake

Science and technology
 Bubble chamber, a particle detector in physics
 Bubble Nebula, NGC 7635, in space
 Bubble Nebula (NGC 6822), in space
 Bubble (computing), a delay in a pipeline
 Bubble (programming language), developed by Bubble Group
 Bubble memory, a type computer memory
 Bubble, a negation logic gate symbol

Sports
 Bio-secure bubble, an isolation zone used for hosting sporting events
 2020 NBA Bubble
 Bubble, a term used in poker tournaments
 Bubble, in the NCAA basketball tournament selection process

Other uses
 Bubbles (chimpanzee), who lived with Michael Jackson
 Bubbles, a hippopotamus who escaped from Lion Country Safari in Irvine, California, U.S.
 Bubble, or pizzo, a pipe used to freebase drugs
 Bubbles, a mephedrone product, a synthetic stimulant drug
 Filter bubble, a state of intellectual isolation
 Bubble, a style of Hi-Riser automobile

See also 

 
 
 Bubble Act, a 1720 Act of the Parliament of Great Britain 
 Bubble and squeak, a British vegetable dish
 Bubble Boy (disambiguation) 
 Bubble tea, a tea-based drink
 Bubblegum 
 Bubble wrap, a packaging material
 Bulla (disambiguation) (Latin, 'bubble')
 Champagne, a French sparkling wine
 "I'm Forever Blowing Bubbles, a popular American song written in 1918
 Microbubble, a very small bubble 
 Speech balloon, or speech bubble, a graphic convention 
 Support bubble (disambiguation)